The Irwin Library is one of the three libraries operated by Butler University, Indianapolis, United States. Minoru Yamasaki was the lead architect, and constructed the library in the architectural style of New Formalism. Construction of the library cost $2.25 million, of which $1.5 million was underwritten by the Irwin-Sweeney-Miller foundation. After construction was finished, the library's first day of operation was on September 9, 1963. The library was named in honor of William G. Irwin, who served as a trustee of Butler University from 1908 until his death in 1943.

Irwin Library consists of the business, education, curriculum, and liberal arts resources as well as the performing and fine arts collections. Butler University's second library, the Ruth Lilly Science Library, contains resources for Biological Sciences, Chemistry, Computer Science, Engineering, Mathematics and Actuarial Science, Pharmacy and Health Sciences, and Physics. Butler University's third library, the Education Resource Library, serves the College of Education by providing access to children’s, young adult, curricular, and professional resources.

In 2021, a six-person panel of American Institute of Architects (AIA) Indianapolis members identified Irwin Library among the ten most "architecturally significant" buildings completed in the city since World War II.

Events 
On February 21, 2017, Irwin Library participated in Butler University's celebration of America's entry into World War I by displaying two exhibits: "The Great War: From Ration Lines to the Front Lines" and "Exploring the Great War Through the Arts". Butler University also held a concert featuring sheet music from "Exploring the Great War Through the Arts": "Britain, the USA,--and Indiana, The Great War in Song: Popular and Art Songs From and About World War I".

Study Rooms 
Irwin Library features study rooms for individuals and groups that can be used for up to four hours at a time. Students can reserve study rooms ahead of time using Butler University's online reservation system.

References

University and college academic libraries in the United States
Butler University